Jamalul Kiram II (1884-7 June 1936) was Sultan of Sulu (ruled 1894–1915). During his long reign, he signed treaties with several nations. He served under both Spain and America.

Jamalul Kiram II rose to the throne following Sultan Harun Ar-Rashid allegedly being forced to abdicate in 1894 after Kiram’s Datu supporters elected him to sultan. Over the following decade, tensions in the American-controlled Philippines would break out into insurrection and war, leading the USA to negotiate the Kiram-Bates Treaty in 1899, believing the Sultan would be able to suppress Moro resistance to American colonization, as well as ensuring Sulu neutrality in the war broadly. Sultan Jamalul Kiram II and other government advisers and Datus, most notably Hadji Butu, agreed to the treaty both desiring American economic support to Sulu's dismal finances, alongside fears of American aggression should they decline.

The treaty was retracted on the 2 March 1904 however, with the Office of U.S. President Theodore Roosevelt declaring the Kiram-Bates Treaty null and void, following the suppression of the Filipinos to the North. With annexation looming, Kiram joined the Moros struggle against the American expansion, prolonging an asymmetrical war across the Sulu Archipelago against superior equipment and manpower reserves the US possessed. After 9 years of warfare, Kiram resigned himself to the Carpenter Treaty on 22 March 1915, effectively constituted the fall of the Sulu Sultanate and enshrined full American sovereignty over its former lands. This officially concluded over 400 years of Sulu independent sovereignty, although the war gains had already been organized into the Department of Mindanao and Sulu.

Kiram was appointed as a senator of the Philippines from the 12th district in 1931, serving for one term until 1934.

Kiram continued to live in his residence at Maimbung for the remainder of his life, dying after kidney troubles there on the 7 June 1936. He did not have any son nor heir. Although he had seven daughters, no woman could be appointed as heir or successor according to Islamic law.

References

Sultans of Sulu
1884 births
1936 deaths
Senators of the 9th Philippine Legislature